Quargnento is a comune (municipality) in the Province of Alessandria in the Italian region Piedmont, located about  east of Turin and about  northwest of Alessandria.

It is home to a notable Catholic basilica, San Dalmazio.

Twin towns — sister cities
Quargnento is twinned with:

  Coubon, France

References